Unsöld is a surname. Notable people with the surname include:

 Albrecht Unsöld (1905–1995), German astrophysicist
 Oliver Unsöld (born 1973), coach for Germany's 2017 CISM World Football Cup squad

See also
 2842 Unsöld, a main belt asteroid
 Unsoeld, a surname

German-language surnames